Sharjah Electricity, Water and Gas Authority, also popularly known as SEWA, is a government utility in the Emirate of Sharjah which provides electricity, water and natural gas to approximately 300,000 consumers. It owns a bottled drinking water subsidiary named Zulal.

Since 2020, Saeed Sultan Al Suwaidi has served as chairman.

History 
SEWA was a private company before the United Arab Emirates was formed in 1971. It was then called Sharjah Electricity & Water Resources Company.

It later became part of the Sharjah government, and named the Electricity and Water Department. As the emirate grew, the company was expanded to become a financially and administratively independent entity. This decree was issued by Sheikh Dr. Sultan Bin Mohammed Al-Qassimi.

SEWA opened a new SCADA center in Nasseriya in 2015. As of April 2018, it had implemented 40,000 smart meters.

Power stations 
SEWA operates the following power stations, which have a total installed capacity of at least 5,000 MW as of 2022:

 Wasit Power Station
 Layyah Power Station
 Hamriya Power Station 
 Kalba Power Station
 Khorfakkan Power Station

Some of SEWA's power is also supplied by Transco (Abu Dhabi).

Water plants 
SEWA operates the following water generation plants in UAE. They are mainly desalination plants:

 Layyah Plant
 Hamriya Plant (new and old)
 ADWEA
 UTICO
 Khorfakkan
 Kalba
 Abu Mussa, Seir Bu Neir & Zubair
 Sharjah Well Fields
 Khorfakkan Well Fields

See also
 Sharjah
 Emirate of Sharjah
 H.E Dr. Rashid Alleem
 His Highness Dr. Sheikh Sultan bin Mohammed Al Qasimi
 Dubai Electricity and Water Authority
 Abu Dhabi

References 

Organisations based in Sharjah (city)
Government agencies of the United Arab Emirates
Organisations based in the Emirate of Sharjah